Steven ("Steve") James Lewis (born 20 May 1986) is an English pole vaulter. His personal best jump of 5.82 metres, set in July 2012, is the former British record for the event. Indoors his best is 5.77 m, achieved in Dessau on 2 March 2012.

Lewis was born in Stoke-on-Trent, and he attended Holden Lane High School. Originally a hurdler, he switched to pole vaulting.  Lewis finished in fourth place at the 2009 European Indoor Championships with jump of 5.71 m, which resulted in British head coach Charles van Commenee praising his development.

He represented Great Britain at the 2008 Summer Olympics and the 2012 Summer Olympics and is a three-time medalist for England at the Commonwealth Games. He has participated at the World Championships in Athletics on five occasions (2007, 2009, 2011, 2013 and 2015) and was a finalist on multiple occasions. He has been a finalist at the IAAF World Indoor Championships three times.

Lewis achieved a personal best and broke the British record of 5.80 m set by Nick Buckfield in 1998, with a vault of 5.82 m at the 2012 Janusz Kusociński Memorial in Szczecin, Poland. He competed in the 2012 Summer Olympics, finishing in fourth place with a vault of 5.75 m, becoming Britain's most successful men's pole vault Olympian.

In 2014, he won the Commonwealth title, completing a full set of Commonwealth medals.

Injured in 2016 Lewis missed the Rio Olympic Qualification Standard and retired in early 2017 in Reno, Nevada.  Lewis is considered one of the most successful British pole-vaulter of all time after representing Great Britain in major championship finals consistently over a 12-year period, winning 13 national titles, breaking junior and senior records, and winning international medals.

Competition record

References

External links

1986 births
Living people
Sportspeople from Stoke-on-Trent
English male pole vaulters
British male pole vaulters
Olympic male pole vaulters
Olympic athletes of Great Britain
Athletes (track and field) at the 2008 Summer Olympics
Athletes (track and field) at the 2012 Summer Olympics
Commonwealth Games medallists in athletics
Commonwealth Games gold medallists for England
Commonwealth Games silver medallists for England
Commonwealth Games bronze medallists for England
Athletes (track and field) at the 2006 Commonwealth Games
Athletes (track and field) at the 2010 Commonwealth Games
Athletes (track and field) at the 2014 Commonwealth Games
World Athletics Championships athletes for Great Britain
British Athletics Championships winners
AAA Championships winners
Medallists at the 2006 Commonwealth Games
Medallists at the 2010 Commonwealth Games
Medallists at the 2014 Commonwealth Games